Shenipsit Lake (or Snipsic lake; shin-ip-SIT), known locally as "The Snip", is a natural lake used as a water storage facility with a water size of  located in Tolland County, Connecticut, bordering the towns of Ellington, Tolland and the Rockville section of Vernon, Connecticut, at . It is the source of the Hockanum River.

History
Native American trails pass directly by Shenipsit Lake. The trails were used by early European settlers to proceed from the East towards the Connecticut River. The trail exists in parts unpaved near the lake.

External links
Water Quality Assessment

Lakes of Tolland County, Connecticut
Vernon, Connecticut
Reservoirs in Connecticut
Ellington, Connecticut
Protected areas of Tolland County, Connecticut
Connecticut placenames of Native American origin